The Republican Party of India (United), or RPI(U) is a coalition of many factions of the Republican Party of India (RPI). It was formed in preparation for the 2009 Maharashtra Legislative Assembly election. The party was initially led by Rajendra Gavai, Jogendra Kawade, T.M. Kamble, and others but Gavai's faction later split from the united party. The group has since suffered internal strife similar to the disputes prior to the coalition's creation. Several parties still claim to be RPI.

The RPI(U) was part of the Republican Left Democratic Front coalition in Maharashtra preceding the state's 2009 election.

Membership

The RPI(U) currently includes:
Peoples Republican Party, led by Jogendra Kawade
Republican Party of India of T. M. Kamble
Republican Party of India of B. C. Kamble
Republican Party of India of Rajabhau Khobragade 
Republican Party of India (Dhale)
Republican Party Of India (Mogha)
Republican Party Of India (Talwatkar)
Republican Party of India (Sivaraj)
Indian Republican Party (Dalit Panther) of Namdeo Dhasal
Bahujan Mahasangh of Makhram Pawar

References

Ambedkarite political parties